The Journal of Research of the National Institute of Standards and Technology is the flagship peer-reviewed scientific journal of the National Institute of Standards and Technology. It has been published since 1904. Its former name was Journal of Research of the National Bureau of Standards. Its section D (Radio Science, 1964–1965; Radio Propagation, 1959–1963) was continued as the Radio Science journal. The final editor-in-chief was Ron B. Goldfarb.  Volume 126 is the last issue.

References

External links
 

National Institute of Standards and Technology
Engineering journals
English-language journals
Bimonthly journals
Publications established in 1904
Academic journals published by the United States government
Publications disestablished in 2021